Norwegian Folktales is a collection of Norwegian folktales and legends by Peter Christen Asbjørnsen and Jørgen Moe.  It is also known as Asbjørnsen and Moe, after the collectors.

Asbjørnsen and Moe
Asbjørnsen, a teacher, and Moe, a minister, had been friends for about 15 years when in 1841 they published the first volume of folktales – the collection of which had been an interest of both for some years. The work's popularity is partly attributable to Norway's newly won partial independence, and the wave of nationalism that swept the country in the 19th century; and the Norwegian written language they contributed to developing (i.e., what would become Bokmål). The language of their publication of the fairy tales struck a balance in that, while it did not preserve their original dialect form in its entirety, it did import certain non-Danish features from it (dialect words and certain syntactic constructions).

Asbjørnsen and Moe were inspired by the German folktale collectors, the Brothers Grimm, not merely to emulate their methodology, but drawing encouragement by it, their endeavor was a work of national importance, especially as the Grimms openly gave high praise for the Norske folkeeventyr. Asbjørnsen and Moe applied the principles espoused by the Grimms, for instance, using a simple linguistic style in place of dialects, while maintaining the original form of the stories. Moreover, Asbjørnsen and Moe did not publish collected folktales in the raw, but created "retold" versions, seeking to reconstruct the lost Urform of the tales—although the alterations performed were not as drastic as the Grimms sometimes allowed license for themselves. The Norwegian pair also collected tales from the field themselves, in contrast to the Grimms.

Publications
The original series, entitled Norske Folkeeventyr went into publication piecemeal. It first appeared a slim pamphlet (1841) offering a selection of a few tales,  without a title page, the editor's names or table of contents. This was sufficiently well-received, and championed by P. A. Munch in a German newspaper. It led to the appearance of a reprint of the first volume in 1843 and the second volume in 1844 as proper hardcovers. The second edition appeared in 1852. Another series dubbed the "New Collection" appeared later (Norske Folke-Eventyr. Ny Samling  1871). The tales are numbered, the original collection containing 58 tales, increased to 60 tales in later editions. The new collection held 50 tales.

Asbjørnsen as a solo project collected and published Norske Huldre-Eventyr og Folkesagn I-II (1845–48), which also was expanded by a "second collection," (Norske huldre-eventyr og folkesagn: anden samling 1866).

Illustrators

The first fully illustrated edition of the book was the 1879 edition of Asbjørnsen's Norske folke- og huldre-eventyr, which featured the artworks of several artists: Peter Nicolai Arbo (1831−1892), Hans Gude (1825−1903), Eilif Peterssen (1852−1928), August Schneider (1842−1873), Otto Sinding  (1842−1909), Adolph Tidemand (1814−1876), and Erik Werenskiold (1855−1938).

In later editions, Werenskiold and Theodor Kittelsen became prominent illustrators. Kittelsen was an unknown artist when he began collaborating on the project on the recommendation of his friend Werenskiold.

Translation into English
The tales were first translated into English by Sir George Webbe Dasent. He translated all but a few of the tales from the two series of Norske Folkeeventyr. Dasent's Popular Tales from the Norse (1859), contains all 58 tales from the initial edition of the original collection. Dasent's Tales from the Fjeld: A Second Series of Popular Tales (1874) covers the two tales added to later editions of the original collection and 45 of the tales from the new collection.

Asbjørnsen and Moe evidently approved of Dasent's translations: "In France and England collections have appeared in which our tales have not only been correctly and faultlessly translated, but even rendered with exemplary truth and care nay, with thorough mastery. The English translation, by George Webbe Dasent, is the best and happiest rendering of our tales that has appeared." The latest translation into English is by Tiina Nunnally in 2019.

H. L. Braekstad, Round the Yule Log: Norwegian Folk and Fairy Tales (1881) includes tales from the Norske Huldre-Eventyr. An abridged translation of Stroebe's Nordische Volksmärchen (1922), rendered into English by Martens, provides additional tales from the various collections, and complements the above translations to some extent. Carl Norman's Norwegian Folktales (1960) is a selection that includes some of the tales from the Ny Samling omitted by Dasent.

List of Norwegian folktales

Norske Folkeeventyr
Legend:
 "NF#" - Tale number as they appear in Asbjørnsen and Moe's Norske Folkeeventyr
 "Modern Norwegian Title" - Modernized spelling (conforms with Projekt Runeberg e-texts).
 "AT index" - Aarne–Thompson classification system index for folktale type.
 "Da#" - Tale number as appears in Dasent's translation, usable as sort key.
 "Br." "Iversen & Nor."  "Str. & Martens" "Nunn." - the Braekstad, Iversen & Norman, Stroebe & Martens, and Nunnally translations.

Norske Folkeeventyr Ny Samling
New Collection. The NF# will be given contiguous from the original collection.

Norske Huldre-Eventyr

Legend:
 "Hu#" - Tale number in Norske Huldre-Eventyr (1845–48), with continuous numbering for the "second collection" (1866)
 "Modern Norwegian Title" - Modernized spelling (conforms to Projekt Runeberg e-texts).
 "Year" - Year of collection. Enumerated in the index and under the title in the 3rd edition (1870).
 "Br#" - Tale number as appears in Braekstad's Round the Yule Log.
 "Str. & Martens"  - Stroebe & Martens translation.
 "Chr. & Iversen"  - Christiansen ed., translated by Pat Shaw Iversen.

Other pieces
Tales not from any of the proceeding series that are usually included alongside them in later collections:

Influence
The Soria Moria castle, which appeared in Dasent's translations of the tales, inspired J. R. R. Tolkien to use the name Moria for a fabulous subterranean complex in his Middle-earth stories.

Footnotes

Explanatory notes

References

Citations

Bibliography

Texts
 Nasjonalbiblioteket copy - #1 to Die tre Bukkerne (here #41)
1st edition, 2den Deels 1ste Hefte - #42 to Jomfruen på glassberget (here #52.)
2nd edition, Christiania: Johan Dahls Forlag (1852) copy
3rd edition, Christiania: Jacob Dybwad (1866)
4th ed., Christiania: Jacob Dybwad, (1868-1871)
5th ed., Christiania: Jacob Dybwad (1874)
7th ed., Christiania: H. Aschehoug & Co (1904)
 
 

etext via Internet Archive
2nd edition, Kjøbenhavn: J. Jørgensen & Co. (1876)

 - base for the  German translation.

 - base for the  translation.
 - non-Fraktur typeface

Vol. 2 (1884) copy at HathiTrust
Vol. 3 (1887)
Vol. 1, 2nd ed., w/ Moltke Moe (1898)

Vol. 2 (1908)
Vol. 3, 2nd ed. (1908)

Translations
 Nasjonalbiblioteket copy

 

 Teil 1 via Google Books
 Teil 2 via Google Books

; e-text via Internet

Other

External links

Norske Folkeeventyr audio books in Norwegian
English translation of Norske Folkeeventyr: Popular Tales From the Norse translated by George Webbe Dasent, Third Edition, 1888

Norwegian fairy tales
Collections of fairy tales
Scandinavian folklore
1840s children's books
Aarne-Thompson Grouping
Asbjørnsen and Moe